Sweet Black Angel is an album by blues musician Earl Hooker released on the Blue Thumb label in 1969. The album was co-produced by musician Ike Turner and Blue Thumb founder Bob Krasnow.

Reception

The AllMusic review stated: "It's a wide-ranging collection, as its oddly generic song titles ("Country and Western," "Shuffle," "Funky Blues") would eloquently indicate."

Track listing
 "I Feel Good" (James Brown) – 2:02
 "Drivin' Wheel" (Roosevelt Sykes) – 3:19
 "Shuffle" (Bob Krasnow, Earl Hooker, Ike Turner) – 2:49
 "Country and Western" (Hooker) – 3:05
 "Sweet Home Chicago" (Robert Johnson, Adapted by Earl Hooker) – 2:52
 "Sweet Black Angel" (Robert Nighthawk) – 2:31
 "Boogie, Don't Blot!" (Krasnow, Turner) – 2:26
 "Cross Cut Saw" (R. G. Ford) – 2:24
 "Catfish Blues" (Krasnow, Hooker, Turner) – 2:36
 "The Mood" (Hooker, Turner) – 1:38
 "Funky Blues" (Turner) – 2:27

Personnel

Earl Hooker – guitar, vocals
Mack Simmons – speech, harmonica
Ike Turner – piano, guitar ("The Mood")
Soko Richardson – drums
Possibly Jesse Knight Jr – bass

References

Earl Hooker albums
1969 albums
Blue Thumb Records albums
Albums produced by Ike Turner